The Canadian Journal of Behavioural Science is a quarterly peer-reviewed academic journal published by the American Psychological Association on behalf of the Canadian Psychological Association. The editor-in-chief is Allison J. Ouimet (University of Ottawa). The journal was established in 1969 and covers all aspects of psychology.

Abstracting and indexing 
The journal is abstracted and indexed by MEDLINE/PubMed and the Social Sciences Citation Index. According to the Journal Citation Reports, the journal has a 2020 impact factor of 1.574.

References

External links 
 

American Psychological Association academic journals
Multilingual journals
Psychology journals
Quarterly journals
Publications established in 1969
Canadian Psychological Association academic journals